Blister is a Norwegian rock band consisting of Håvard Hernes, Lars Lundevall, Aslak Dørum, Atle Karlsen and Rune Lindstrøm. They have recorded one album under the name Brand New Antiques in 2003

Members
Håvard Hernes - vocals (2003–present)
Lars Lundevall - guitars (2003–present)
Aslak Dørum - bass (2003–present)
Atle Karlsen - keyboards (2003–present)
Rune Peder Lindstrøm - drums (2003–present)

Norwegian musical groups